Shawn Z. is an American folk rock/Americana singer and guitarist. He is a member of the Americana Music Association.

Early years 
Shawn had a band called "Elmo Lincoln" that played local bars and clubs and later changing the name to "South 40". One afternoon, while playing a benefit show, his father was also playing with his band at the same show.  Shawn and his father finally got together and decided to leave their bands and form a new band called "BFD".  
The band became popular in the Northeast region rapidly.

Finally, Shawn and his father were together and doing what they love.

After ongoing disputes with other band members, they both left the band 8 years later and formed "The Cojones Brothers" – an acoustic duo.   Finally performing originals along with favorite cover songs.

"The Cojones Brothers" rose fast on the scene and their schedule became even more demanding for performing.

In 2003, after a drunken dispute at a New Year's Eve show, "The Cojones Brothers" were no more.

It was then that Shawn began performing more solo shows.

Radio 
In Shawn's teenage years, he started DJ’ing at a local teen center after school and on weekend nights. He then got introduced the chance to be an actual radio DJ. “Shawn Shannon” was then brought to the airwaves. 

While in his early high school years, he was asked to come to another radio station for overnights on weekends and help with promotions.   

After his position at that station had ended, he applied for another position at another radio station. 
He was accepted immediately for weeknights.

Years later, that station was bought out by the national corporate radio company Citadel Broadcasting. Citadel had decided to abandon the format and station(s) direction and went to simulcast one of their other stations on the Newly acquired frequencies. Along with the format, many of the staff of were also let go.

Citadel, however, wanted to keep Shawn on their staff. So they moved him to their Northeast Pennsylvania headquarters to help with current station buyouts, format changes, on-air duties, commercial/imaging production and more. 

It was then that Shawn started feeling 'something wasn't right' with his health, but he let it go.

After dealing with his increasing health concerns, Shawn finally went to see a doctor. Then discovered he had Lupus and Emphysema.
Those diagnoses forced Shawn to take time off of his daily work schedule and focus on his health while continuing to see specialists for his health issues. Eventually, he found himself seeing doctors and specialists full-time instead of going to work.

In January 2008, he was asked to come back to the very same radio studios that once was the home of the station that brought Shawn to Citadel.  Two and a half months later, he learned that his health wouldn't allow him to take on those hours anymore.

He is still active in radio with the reservation radio station and voice-tracking for stations all around the U.S.

Musical career 
After years with his father in "BFD" and "The Cojones Brothers", Shawn became more anxious to get his original music out to the world.

While talking and writing with friends he met throughout his radio years and travels, they convinced him to make a record and "give it a shot".

So, in October 2004, Shawn caught up with old friends Bret Alexander, Paul Smith and Ron Simasek from Pennsylvania local and national recording artist favorites "The Badlees".

They got together in Bret's studio "Saturation Acres" and recorded 9 songs. That recording became Shawn's debut independent release "Wishful Drinkin'" released in January 2005.

Wishful Drinkin' reached No. 11 while on the Americana charts for 14 weeks, with radio play across the world on Americana and NPR stations, as well as on Sirius & XM Satellite radio.
Singles such as "Wishful Drinkin'", "Been Down" and "Talking Cover Band Blues" quickly became radio favorites. Along with the new 'Outlaw' version of P.F. Sloan's "Eve of Destruction".

With the great reception on the Americana music scene, Shawn became a member of the Americana Music Association.

At the beginning of 2008, Shawn and the band decided to go back in the studio. This time, he had long time friend and former WEMR general manager Jim Petrie as a co-writer on many of the songs recorded.   Jim also came with a long background in songwriting and working in the music business.
Together, they decided to name this recording Saint Jude Avenue, which was released Sept. 2008. Singles "Poison Water", "Half Baked" and "Uncle Willie" are among the radio favorites, as well as single download favorites on mp3 stores.

Discography

Albums 
 Wishful Drinkin' (2005)
 Saint Jude Avenue (2008)

Singles 
 Wishful Drinkin' (2005)
 Talking Cover Band Blues (2005)
 Hey Judge Judy (2005)
 Been Down (2005)
 Poison Water (2008)
 Half Baked (2008)
 Uncle Willie (2008)
 Summertime Blues (2010)

References 

 Shawn Z interview at Junior's Cave
 Shawn Z. keeps it real –  The Weekender Magazine
 Amplifier Magazine (not online)
 Shawn Z. at Sirius XM Satellite Radio – Channel 12 'Outlaw Country' radio charts
 Shawn Z. at CD Baby
 Shawn Z. | Album Discography
 Wishful Drinkin' on AllMusic Wishful Drinkin' – Shawn Z. | Songs, Reviews, Credits
 Saint Jude Avenue on AllMusic Saint Jude Avenue – Shawn Z. | Songs, Reviews, Credits

American folk rock musicians
Year of birth missing (living people)
Living people
21st-century American guitarists
21st-century American male singers
21st-century American singers
American male guitarists